Exaculum is a monotypic genus of flowering plants belonging to the family Gentianaceae. The only species is Exaculum pusillum.

Its native range is Southwestern Europe to Western and Central Mediterranean.

References

Gentianaceae
Gentianaceae genera
Monotypic Gentianales genera